General elections were held in Tanzania on 26 October 1980. The country was a one-party state at the time, with the Chama Cha Mapinduzi as the sole legal party, following the 1977 merger of the mainland-based Tanganyika African National Union and the Zanzibar-based Afro-Shirazi Party, which had previously operated as the sole legal parties in their areas. For the National Assembly election there were two candidates from the same party in each of the 106  constituencies, whilst the presidential election was effectively a referendum on CCM leader Julius Nyerere's candidacy.

Voter turnout was 85.9% of the 6,969,803 registered voters in the presidential election and 84.7% for the National Assembly, although the country's population was around 18 million at the time of the election.

Results

President

National Assembly

References

Presidential elections in Tanzania
General
Elections in Tanzania
One-party elections
Tanzania
October 1980 events in Africa